2 Stupid Dogs is an American animated television series created and designed by Donovan Cook and produced by Hanna-Barbera Cartoons. It originally ran from September 5, 1993, to May 15, 1995, on TBS as a part of their Sunday Morning in Front of the TV block and in syndication. The show's main segments feature two unnamed dogs, called "The Big Dog" and "The Little Dog" in the credits (voiced by Brad Garrett and Mark Schiff, respectively).

The show has been described as "Hanna-Barbera's answer to Ren and Stimpy", a hit show that premiered two years earlier in 1991 on Nickelodeon. Like Ren & Stimpy, the Dogs characters are not very bright, the show is scored with jazz music, and the comedy style leans on gross-out body-secretion humor. Asked about the comparison, Hanna-Barbera CEO Fred Seibert was unconcerned, saying that it was "like Pearl Jam worrying about being compared to Nirvana." Ironically, following his dismissal from Nickelodeon, Ren and Stimpy creator John Kricfalusi was credited as contributing "bad taste" gags to a few episodes of Dogs.

A backup segment, Super Secret Secret Squirrel (a sequel series to Secret Squirrel), is shown in between the main 2 Stupid Dogs cartoons in the first season's episodes, similar to early Hanna-Barbera cartoons from the 1960s.

The show entirely used digital ink and paint in every episode.

Plot
The show is about two unnamed dogs—neither of whom, as the title states, is very intelligent—and their everyday misadventures. The Big Dog tends to talk much less than the Little Dog. When the Big Dog talks, he usually talks about food. The animation style in the first season is unusual for the time: a very flat and simplistic style similar to the early Hanna-Barbera cartoons of the 1950s and 1960s, but with early 1990s humor and sensibility. The wilder, more absurd second season has more fluid and exaggerated character animation.

Characters
 The Big Dog (voiced by Brad Garrett) is a large grey Old English Sheepdog with a purple nose. He is much stronger and significantly more stoic and reserved than the Little Dog, and speaks much less – on occasion, he has also been shown to be surprisingly smarter than the Little Dog.
 The Little Dog (voiced by Mark Schiff), a small, tawny-colored Dachshund, is much more energetic and hyperactive than the Big Dog. The Little Dog is very scared of cats, and when a cat (usually the same cat) appears, it is the Big Dog who scares it away.
 The Cat is a small innocent cat which the Little Dog is terrified of, despite it being harmless. The Big Dog's bark causes the Cat to freeze in terror; however, the Cat is not afraid of the Big Dog unless he barks.
 Mr. Hollywood (voiced by Brian Cummings) is a large man who is both arrogant and loud, and likes to point out others' mistakes. He has a completely different job in each appearance, including teacher, farmer, casino manager, Noah and pet shop salesman. When pointing out others' mistakes he will first say, "Well now, isn't that cute..." and then yell out, "...BUT IT'S WRONG!!!", usually accompanied by a blaring foghorn.
 Cubby (voiced by Rob Paulsen) is a fat, spotty man with big glasses, blonde hair and blue lips. In the episodes that he appears in, he works different jobs, like Mr. Hollywood.
 Kenny Fowler (voiced by Jarrett Lennon) is a small skinny kid with nerdy glasses, who is often pushed around by Buzz and often falls down.
 Buzz (voiced by Whit Hertford) is a school bully who picks on Kenny and says "What a Fowler!" whenever Kenny falls or makes a mistake.
 Buffy Ziegenhagen (voiced by Tawni Tamietti) is a girl in Kenny's class who he has a crush on and who has a secret crush on him.
 Red (voiced by Candi Milo) is a small, meek little girl that the dogs sometimes encounter in the woods. When she speaks, she shouts one word (sometimes two) in the sentence very loudly compared to the quiet tone of voice she usually has. Trying to visit her grandmother, she ends up in trouble due to her bad eyesight and the dogs' stupidity.

Episodes

Home media
On August 14, 2018, Warner Bros. Home Entertainment (via the Warner Archive Collection) released the first season of the series as 2 Stupid Dogs/Secret Squirrel Show Volume One on DVD.

Reception
Martin "Dr. Toon" Goodman of Animation World Magazine described 2 Stupid Dogs as one of two "clones" of The Ren & Stimpy Show, the other one being The Shnookums and Meat Funny Cartoon Show. The series was nominated for a Daytime Emmy Award but lost to Rugrats.

Accolades

See also

 List of works produced by Hanna-Barbera Productions
 List of Hanna-Barbera characters

Notes

References

External links

 
 
 
 
 

1993 American television series debuts
1995 American television series endings
1990s American animated television series
1990s American children's comedy television series
American children's animated comedy television series
Animated television series about dogs
English-language television shows
First-run syndicated television programs in the United States
The Funtastic World of Hanna-Barbera
TBS (American TV channel) original programming
Television series by Hanna-Barbera